Gods Behaving Badly is a novel by the British author Marie Phillips. It was first published by Jonathan Cape in 2007. Set in London, it tells the tale of the twelve gods of Mount Olympus living in a rundown flat as their powers wane. It was selected for The Atlantic's 1book140 Twitter book club's book of the month for August 2011.

Synopsis
A young woman named Alice finds a job as a cleaning lady in a London flat. She's unaware that the tenants are Greek gods, fallen into disgrace because nobody believes in them anymore. Apollo falls in love with Alice, but when he discovers that she's already in love with a boy named Neil, he tricks Zeus into killing her with lightning.

Feeling guilty, he tries to apologize to Neil, but winds up blocking out the sun in a fit of anger. At that moment, Apollo loses his energy and dies, leaving the world without a sun. Neil descends into Hades in search of Alice's and Apollo's souls, intent on resurrecting his beloved and saving the world.

Characters

Gods
 Aphrodite
 Apollo
 Ares
 Artemis
 Athena
 Eros
 Dionysus
 Hephaestus
 Hermes
 Zeus
 Hera
 Poseidon
 Demeter
 Styx

Humans
 Alice
 Neil

Film adaptation

The novel was adapted into a 2013 film directed by Marc Turtletaub. The setting was changed from London to New York City; it starred Alicia Silverstone, Sharon Stone, and Oliver Platt. The film premiered at the 2013 Rome Film Festival, but received negative reviews and was never distributed.

References

External links
Maslin, Janet. Has-Beens "Has-Beens From Olympus Downgraded to Mortals ". The New York Times. December 6, 2007.

2007 British novels
Classical mythology in popular culture
Novels set in London
Low fantasy novels
Jonathan Cape books
Greek and Roman deities in fiction
British novels adapted into films
2007 debut novels
2007 fantasy novels